General elections were held in the Territory of Curaçao on 5 November 1945. Ten of the fifteen seats in the Estates of Curaçao were elected, with the remaining five appointed by governor P.A. Kasteel. The ten elected seats consisted of five for Curaçao, three for Aruba, one for Bonaire and one for the SSS Islands

From a population of 127,866 (December 1944) only 6,093 men, about 5% of the population, were entitled to vote in the elections. This was the last parliamentary election in Curaçao before the introduction of universal suffrage.

Results

Curaçao
Population: 78,587 (31 December 1944)
Entitled to vote: 4,095
Valid votes: 3,520 
Invalid votes: 45
Seats: 5
Average valid votes per seat: 704

Wix received enough preferential votes to get elected. With 2,122 votes 3 seats were obtained by the DP; 707 votes per seat. Wix had just more than 50% of 707 votes.

W.W. de Regt was succeeded by P.H. Maal.

Aruba
Population: 39,318 (31 December 1944)
Entitled to vote: 1,906
Valid votes: 1,728 
Seats: 3
Average valid votes per seat: 576

Bonaire
Population: 5,798 (31 December 1944)
Entitled to vote: 102
Valid votes: 94
Seats: 1

SSS Islands
Entitled to vote: 148 (Sint Maarten: 60, Sint Eustatius: 45, Saba: 43)
Seats: 1

W.R. Plantz was the only candidate so the seat for the SSS Islands went automatically to him.

Appointed by the governor
Gerharts was not on time to hand over his letter of credence and therefore he lost his seat. The governor decided to use one of the five seats he could appoint for Gerharts, so he still became a member of the Estates of Curaçao. The other four people who were appointed by the governor were A.W.J.M. Desertine, V.E. Henriquez, C.W.J. Jonckheer and E. Cohen Henriquez.

Aftermath 
The governor decided that Desertine was the speaker of the parliament and Plantz the deputy speaker.

The new session of the Estates started on the first Tuesday of April 1946. Because of the issue with the letter of credence of Gerharts the number of members of the Estates of Curaçao was not 15 but 14.

References
 Amigoe di Curaçao 2 August 1945
 Amigoe di Curaçao, 5 November 1945
 Amigoe di Curaçao, 6 November 1945

Elections in the Netherlands Antilles
Curacao